NATC may refer to:

Naval Air Test Center, a center for the United States Navy
Naval Air Training Command, a United States Navy command that administers the training of students in the aviation field 
NATC Nevada Test Center, see Combat Tactical Vehicle